Cerobates tristriatus is a species of beetles belonging to the family Brentidae.

Description
Females lay eggs on the surface of decayed bark of sapwood, where the larvae construct radial galleries.

Distribution
This species is widely distributed from Sri Lanka to Australia.

References

Brentidae
Beetles described in 1800